Yalova is an electoral district of the Grand National Assembly of Turkey. It elects 3 members of parliament (deputies) to represent the province of the same name for a four-year term by the D'Hondt method, a party-list proportional representation system.

Members 
Population reviews of each electoral district are conducted before each general election, which can lead to certain districts being granted a smaller or greater number of parliamentary seats. Yalova has elected two MPs to parliament since becoming a province in 1995. Prior to that date, it was part of Istanbul for electoral purposes.

General elections

2011

June 2015

June 2015

2018

Presidential elections

2014

References 

Electoral districts of Turkey
Politics of Yalova Province